Lanka Mahavidyalaya, established in 1979, is a general degree college situated at Lanka in Hojai district, Assam. This college is affiliated with the Gauhati University.

References

External links

Universities and colleges in Assam
Colleges affiliated to Gauhati University
Educational institutions established in 1979
1979 establishments in Assam